Martha (minor planet designation: 205 Martha) is a large main belt asteroid. It is a dark, primitive carbonaceous C-type asteroid. This object was discovered by Johann Palisa on 13 October 1879, in Pola and was named after Martha, a woman in the New Testament.

Efforts to determine the rotation period for this asteroid have produced wildly different results, in large part because the actual period is close to half of an Earth day. A study performed during 2013 showed that the light curve changed significantly during the observation period, adding to the difficulty. This study gave a synodic rotation period of 14.905 ± 0.001 h.

References

External links 
 Lightcurve plot of 205 Martha, Palmer Divide Observatory, B. D. Warner (2010)
 Asteroid Lightcurve Database (LCDB), query form (info )
 Dictionary of Minor Planet Names, Google books
 Asteroids and comets rotation curves, CdR – Observatoire de Genève, Raoul Behrend
 Discovery Circumstances: Numbered Minor Planets (1)-(5000) – Minor Planet Center
 
 

000205
Discoveries by Johann Palisa
Named minor planets
000205
000205
18791013